Potok  is a village in the administrative district of Gmina Jedlicze, within Krosno County, Subcarpathian Voivodeship, in south-eastern Poland.

The village has an approximate population of 1,800.

References

Potok